Willem "Wim" Thomassen  (3 October 1909 – 16 June 2001) was a Dutch politician of the Labour Party (PvdA).

Thomassen was born in Amsterdam. He was a schoolteacher and during World War II imprisoned by the Germans in Amsterdam from 1943 until January 1944.

After the war he was secretary of the Dutch People's Movement from August 1945 until July 1946.

On behalf of the Labour Party he was a member of the House of Representatives from July 1946 until July 1948.

Hereafter he was mayor of three municipalities: Zaandam (1948–1958), Enschede (1958–1965), and at last Rotterdam (1965–1974). In his last capacity he contributed significantly to the development of the Port of Rotterdam

Besides he was a member of the Provincial council of North Holland from July 1954 until May 1958, and a member of the Senate from November 1961 until May 1971.

His wife was also a schoolteacher. Wim Thomassen died at age 91 in Bergen (North Holland).

References 
 W. (Wim) Thomassen, Parlement.com

1909 births
2001 deaths
20th-century Dutch educators
20th-century Dutch politicians
Dutch prisoners of war in World War II
Dutch schoolteachers
Labour Party (Netherlands) politicians
Mayors in North Holland
Mayors of Enschede
Mayors of Rotterdam
Members of the House of Representatives (Netherlands)
Members of the Provincial Council of North Holland
Members of the Senate (Netherlands)
People from Amsterdam
People from Zaanstad